Walk a Crooked Mile is a 1948 America anti-communist, Cold War film noir crime film, directed by Gordon Douglas, starring Dennis O'Keefe and Louis Hayward.

Plot
Soon after solid leads come to light about a Communist spy ring infiltrating the Lakeview Laboratory of Nuclear Physics, a southern California atomic research center, Federal Bureau of Investigation agent Dan O'Hara (Dennis O'Keefe) teams up with Scotland Yard detective Philip Grayson (Louis Hayward) to hunt down the perpetrators responsible for the leak, and at least one of the scientists at the nuclear lab is suspected to be involved in the clandestine, espionage operation.

Cast
 Louis Hayward as Philip 'Scotty' Grayson
 Dennis O'Keefe as Daniel F. O'Hara
 Louise Allbritton as Dr. Toni Neva
 Carl Esmond as Dr. Ritter von Stolb
 Onslow Stevens as Igor Braun
 Raymond Burr as Krebs
 Art Baker as Dr. Frederick Townsend
 Lowell Gilmore as Dr. William Forrest
 Philip Van Zandt as Anton Radchek
 Charles Evans as Dr. Homer Allen
 Frank Ferguson as Carl Bemish
 Reed Hadley as Narrator

Production
The film was one of the first Cold War movies, and was made specifically to exploit the new anti-communist sentiment in the country after World War II. Producer Edward Smalls hoped to repeat the success he recently had with the films noir T-Men and Raw Deal. It was director Gordon Douglas' first major production; he had been making B movies for MGM.

The original title was Face of Treason, which was changed to FBI vs Scotland Yard. FBI director J. Edgar Hoover requested it be renamed again, to FBI Meets Scotland Yard, but Small eschewed any collaboration with the agency, as he had discovered how controlling Hoover was when the FBI was involved in a cinematic project. Hoover was involved with a big hit, 1945's The House on 92nd Street, a movie about the FBI's pursuit and conquest of domestic Nazis that showcased the agency's methods and skills. By 1948, the House Un-American Activities Committee hearings about communist influence on the country were underway, and the FBI wanted a movie about this hot new topic, but Small refused to let Hoover co-produce the movie. Small also refused to grant the FBI power to approve the screenplay, so Hoover insisted all traces of the agency be removed from the film. Small refused once again; he held that fictional treatment of a public agency was legitimate. The only concession Small made was regarding the title, consequently The New York Times published a letter from Hoover disavowing any connection to the film and stating that he had not sanctioned it.

Exteriors are mostly from San Francisco but the film starts with exteriors from  Brand Boulevard, Glendale, California.

Reception
When the film was released, The New York Times film critic, Bosley Crowther, while giving the film mixed review, wrote well of the screenplay, "No use to speak of the action or the acting. It's strictly routine. But the plot is deliberately sensational."

The staff at Variety gave the film a favorable review, writing, "Action swings to San Francisco and back to the southland, punching hard all the time under the knowledgeable direction of Gordon Douglas. On-the-site filming of locales adds authenticity.  George Bruce has loaded his script with nifty twists that add air of reality to the meller doings in the Bertram Millhauser story. Dialog is good and situations believably developed, even the highly contrived melodramatic finale. Documentary flavor is forwarded by Reed Hadley's credible narration chore."

References

External links
 
 
 
 
 

1948 films
1940s thriller drama films
American anti-communist propaganda films
American thriller drama films
American spy films
1940s English-language films
American black-and-white films
Cold War spy films
Film noir
Columbia Pictures films
Films shot in San Francisco
Films produced by Edward Small
1948 drama films
Films scored by Paul Sawtell
Films directed by Gordon Douglas
1940s American films